Shlomo Ginossar, (October 16, 1889, Odessa, Ukraine – January 1, 1969, Tel Aviv) son of Ahad Ha'am was the chief Administrator at Hebrew University and was Israel’s Ambassador to Italy from 1959 until 1961.

Personal life
Born Shlomo Ginzberg, he changed the family name to Ginossar while ambassador.  He migrated with his family from Russian to the Ottoman Empire when young. He met his wife Rosa because their fathers were friends.  Together, they went to study at the University of Paris around 1910 and married in Switzerland in 1917.

References

Ambassadors of Israel to Italy
Hebrew University of Jerusalem
University of Paris alumni
Emigrants from the Russian Empire to the Ottoman Empire
Israeli academic administrators
Odesa Jews
Ottoman expatriates in France